Hopewell Avenue Public School is a public elementary/middle school in Ottawa, Ontario, Canada. It teaches grades jk-8. With a student population of about 950, it is the second largest K-8 school in the Ottawa-Carleton District School Board, after Broadview Public School.

History
The school was constructed in 1910. In 1982 the old building was expanded with a new section of approximately the same size.

In 2015 the emerald ash beetle destroyed more than half of the trees in both yards. Later that year the school started a campaign called Every Leaf Counts to raise $200,000 for a new yard.

About
Hopewell is a four-story school with two gymnasiums. The Central Gym can be split into two, creating three: the North, Central and South gyms.

The school follows the Balanced School Day model; the day is split into three blocks of 100 minutes each, separated by 40 minute nutritional/recess breaks. The elementary students stay in their designated classrooms for the whole block while the intermediate students get two 50 minute periods each block. In between these periods, the intermediate students travel to different classes due to them having multiple teachers. On the second break the intermediate students (7-8) can go off school property for 40 minutes while the elementary students (K-6) are to stay on school property.

It provides education in English, Middle French Immersion, and French Immersion, as well as extra classes in other heritage languages on Saturdays. The school offers the Take action group (originally called Me2We club) and Speaker Series. The school also has three bands, junior (grade 7), intermediate (grade 8), and jazz band. 

Mme. Major's grade 3 students were officially recognized by the Canadian Space Agency as partners in the Tomatosphere Project.

The school newsletter, Hopewell Happenings, is available at the school website.

Note: due to Covid restrictions as of 2022 Hopewell no longer lets students go off property for nutrition breaks.

References

External links

 School website
 OCDSB

Elementary schools in Ottawa
Middle schools in Ottawa